A skirt lifter, also known as a dress lifter, skirt grip, dress suspender, hem-holder, page or porte-jupe, was a device for lifting a long skirt to avoid dirt or to facilitate movement. It clamped on to the hem and was attached to the belt by a cord, ribbon, or chain.

The first skirt lifters date from around 1846 and they were most popular in the 1860s-1880s.

Costume designer Penny Rose chose a skirt lifter as her hypothetical donation to the imaginary museum in an August 2017 episode of BBC Radio 4's The Museum of Curiosity.

References

Further reading

 

Fashion accessories